Charalampos Moysiadis (born 28 February 1976) is a Greek footballer who plays as a midfielder.

Club career
Moysiadis previously played in the Greek Super League with Paniliakos F.C. and Aris Thessaloniki F.C.

References

External links
Profile at epae.org
 

1976 births
Living people
Greek footballers
Pierikos F.C. players
A.O. Kerkyra players
Patraikos F.C. players
Paniliakos F.C. players
Aris Thessaloniki F.C. players
Agrotikos Asteras F.C. players
FC Gloria Buzău players
Makedonikos F.C. players
Greek expatriate footballers
Expatriate footballers in Romania
Greek expatriate sportspeople in Romania
Liga I players
Association football midfielders